Codocera is a genus of sand-loving scarab beetles in the family Ochodaeidae. There are at least three described species in Codocera.

Species
These three species belong to the genus Codocera:
 Codocera ferruginea (Eschscholtz, 1818)
 Codocera gnatho (Fall, 1907)
 Codocera tuberculata Medvedev & Nikolajev, 1972

References

Further reading

External links

 

Scarabaeoidea genera
Articles created by Qbugbot